The United States of Murder Inc. is a creator-owned comic book series written by Brian Michael Bendis  originally published under Marvel Comics' Icon imprint. The title is illustrated by Michael Avon Oeming.

References

Marvel Comics limited series
Comics by Brian Michael Bendis